Yoon-ho, also spelled Yun-ho, is a Korean masculine given name.

People with this name include:

Nam Yoon-ho (born 1984), South Korean male curler
Yunho (born Jung Yun-ho, 1986), South Korean singer-songwriter, actor, and member of pop duo TVXQ
Lim Yoon-ho (born 1989), South Korean actor
Ji Yoon-ho (born 1991), South Korean actor

See also
List of Korean given names

References